Edward Nigel Drury  (15 May 1911 – 17 May 1984) was an Australian politician and grandson of Colonel Edward Robert Drury, pastoralist, business man, the first CEO of the Queensland National Bank, and a member of the family well known in Brisbane at the end of the 19th century.

Drury was born in Clifton, Queensland and was educated at Brisbane Grammar School before becoming a corporate accountant. He served in the military from 1942 to 1946 and was on the Queensland State Executive of the Liberal Party on his return. In 1949, he was elected to the Australian House of Representatives as the Liberal member for the new seat of Ryan. In the same year, he married Valerie Thomas, daughter of the Naval Officer in Charge of Brisbane during the Second World War, Captain E P Thomas.

During his parliamentary career, he was chairman of the Commonwealth Immigration Planning Council, a deputy Speaker of the House of Representatives, chairman of the Privileges Committee, and for many years deputy chairman of committees of the House. He held the seat of Ryan through 11 elections, until his retirement in 1975. Drury died in 1984 and was buried in Toowong Cemetery.

His son Dr. Christopher Drury served as the Australian Electoral Officer for South Australia from 2001 until 2011.

References

1911 births
1984 deaths
Liberal Party of Australia members of the Parliament of Australia
Members of the Australian House of Representatives for Ryan
Members of the Australian House of Representatives
Australian Commanders of the Order of the British Empire
Burials at Toowong Cemetery
20th-century Australian politicians